Victor Cliff is an abrupt rock cliff 1.5 nautical miles (2.8 km) long, which forms the southwest shoulder of Long Hills in the Horlick Mountains. It was mapped by the United States Geological Survey (USGS) from surveys and U.S. Navy aerial photographs, 1958–60, and was named by the Advisory Committee on Antarctic Names (US-ACAN) for Lawrence J. Victor, an aurora scientist at Byrd Station in 1961.

References 

Cliffs of Marie Byrd Land